Paul Jeffrey Byrne (born December 15, 1974) is an American film and television actor. He is best known for his roles as Nicky "Rugrat" Koskoff in the Martin Scorsese film The Wolf of Wall Street (2013) and Bolin on Nickelodeon's animated series The Legend of Korra (2012–2014).

Early life and education 
Byrne was born in Maplewood, New Jersey, to Emma N. (Ferraro) and Paul I. Byrne Jr., and was raised in Old Tappan, New Jersey, where he graduated from Northern Valley Regional High School at Old Tappan in 1992.

A graduate of Boston College with a double major in finance and theater and an MFA from The Theatre School at DePaul University, Byrne was on his way to becoming an investment banker out of college when a drama teacher at BC convinced him to follow his passion for acting.

Career 
Byrne started his career in small roles in such films as Bruce Almighty, Fun with Dick and Jane, Bewitched and Because I Said So. He also had guest roles on television series such as ER, The West Wing, Reno 911! and NCIS before getting a recurring role on The Game.

Byrne went on to have more prominent roles in films such as Dinner for Schmucks, Extraordinary Measures, The Campaign and Horrible Bosses. He was cast in one of the main roles in Final Destination 5, which received generally positive reviews and was a commercial success.

In addition to his on-screen roles, Byrne provided the voice of Bolin, one of the lead roles in the Nickelodeon series The Legend of Korra, from the show's beginning in 2012 to its end in 2014.

In 2013, he appeared in the Martin Scorsese directed film The Wolf of Wall Street, which received critical acclaim and was nominated for numerous awards. The next year he starred in the television series Intelligence.

He joined Dwayne Johnson in the 2018 action film Rampage.

Personal life 
He resides in Los Angeles with his wife, Jaime, who was the executive director in Los Angeles and Beverly Hills for health care services and fund-raising for the Muscular Dystrophy Association and now president of Jaime Byrne Events, LLC. Byrne and his wife have two daughters and one son.

Filmography

Film

Television

Music videos

Video game

References

External links 

21st-century American male actors
1974 births
American male film actors
American male television actors
American male voice actors
Boston College alumni
DePaul University alumni
Living people
Male actors from New Jersey
Northern Valley Regional High School at Old Tappan alumni
People from Maplewood, New Jersey
People from Old Tappan, New Jersey